Anup Upadhyay is an Indian stage, film and television actor. He known for portraying David Mishra "Chachaji" in the Hindi comedy series Bhabi Ji Ghar Par Hai!. He has also acted in F.I.R., Lapataganj and in Life Ok serial May I Come In Madam? as Chedilal Hiteshi.

Early life
Upadhyay is from Ganjdundwara in Uttar Pradesh, where he completed his graduation.

Theatre
After graduation, he shifted to Delhi where he started acting in plays alongside Habib Tanvir. Upadhyay has an experience of twenty years in theatre with Dekh Rahe Hain Nayan and Agrabazar being two of his favorite plays.

Television

Filmography

References

External links
 

Living people
Male actors from Mumbai
People from Kasganj district
Year of birth missing (living people)